The 1999 African Junior Athletics Championships was the fourth edition of the biennial, continental athletics tournament for African athletes aged 19 years or younger. It was held in Tunis, Tunisia, from 22–25 July. A total of 43 events were contested, 22 by men and 21 by women.

Medal table

Medal summary

Men

Women

References

Results
African Junior Championships 1999. World Junior Athletics History. Retrieved on 2013-10-13.

African Junior Athletics Championships
African U20 Championships
International athletics competitions hosted by Tunisia
1999 in Tunisian sport
African Junior Athletics
20th century in Tunis
Sport in Tunis
1999 in youth sport